Kabrousse (also spelled Cabrousse) is a village in the rural community of Diembéring, Oussouye, Ziguinchor, Casamance, Senegal. It is a coastal village located a few kilometers south of Cap Skirring. In a straight line, it is the closest place in Africa to South America (2,841 km from Touros, Rio Grande do Norte in northeastern Brazil). About 2 km southeast of Kabrousse is the international border with Guinea-Bissau.

Geography

Notable inhabitants
Aline Sitoe Diatta, the leader of a resistance movement against French West Africa, was born in Nialou in 1920.

Bibliography

References

External links
 Maps, weather and airports for Kabrousse
  In Kabrousse, the school is occupied by the military
  Cultural days in the city of Aline Sitoé Diatta

Populated places in Ziguinchor Region